Stephanie Ann Hsu (born November 25, 1990) is an American actress and singer. Hsu trained at NYU Tisch School for the Arts and began her career in experimental theatre before starring on Broadway, originating the roles of Christine Canigula in Be More Chill (2015–2019) and Karen the Computer in SpongeBob SquarePants: The Broadway Musical (2016–2017).

She received widespread critical acclaim and an Academy Award for Best Supporting Actress nomination for her dual role as Joy Wang and Jobu Tupaki in the film Everything Everywhere All at Once (2022). On television, she is known for her recurring roles in The Marvelous Mrs. Maisel (2019–present) and Awkwafina Is Nora from Queens (2020–2021).

Early life
Hsu was born to a single mother in Torrance, California. Her maternal grandmother had moved from Mainland China to Taiwan to escape the Chinese Civil War. As a teenager, Hsu's mother moved to the United States for a better education. Hsu attended Palos Verdes Peninsula High School. She moved to Brooklyn to pursue theatre and graduated from NYU Tisch School of the Arts in 2012. She also trained with the Atlantic Theater Company.

Career
Hsu began her career in experimental theatre and comedy. From 2013 to 2015, Hsu made regular appearances on the MTV reality comedy series Girl Code. She landed her first recurring television role as Joy Armstrong in the Hulu series The Path.

Hsu was called in for the first table reading of The SpongeBob Musical in 2012 to read for Karen, the anthropomorphic computer. She would go on to play the character on stage in Chicago in 2016 before making her Broadway debut in 2017.

Meanwhile, Hsu originated the main character of Christine Canigula in the first performance of Be More Chill at the regional Two River Theater in Red Bank, New Jersey. She would reprise the role in its off-Broadway run at the Pershing Square Signature Center in 2018 and Broadway run at the Lyceum Theatre in 2019. For her performance, she received Lucille Lortel and Drama Desk Award nominations.

In 2019, Hsu joined the recurring cast of the Amazon Prime series The Marvelous Mrs. Maisel for its third season as Mei Lin. She and the rest of the cast won the 2020 SAG Award for Best Ensemble in a Comedy Series. Hsu starred in the 2020 independent film Asking for It.

Her breakthrough role came in 2022 when Hsu co-starred as Joy Wang, the depressed daughter of Michelle Yeoh's character, and as the nihilistic antagonist Jobu Tupaki in the A24's absurdist comedy-drama film Everything Everywhere All at Once. The film opened at the 2022 South by Southwest (SXSW) to near-universal acclaim, and Hsu's performance was lauded by critics and audiences. She received the Independent Spirit Award for Best Breakthrough Performance and nominations for the Critics' Choice Award, the Screen Actors Guild Award, and the Academy Award for Best Supporting Actress. 

In April 2021, it was announced Hsu would star in Adele Lim's upcoming film Joy Ride. In April 2021, it was announced Hsu would be a guest star in Rian Johnson and Natasha Lyonne's  Peacock series Poker Face. She is also set to appear in Disney+'s American Born Chinese, reuniting with Yeoh and fellow Everything Everywhere All At Once costar Ke Huy Quan.

Filmography

Film

Television

Web

Stage

Awards and nominations

See also
 Taiwanese Americans in Los Angeles
 Asian Americans in arts and entertainment
 List of Asian Academy Award winners and nominees

Notes

References

External links
 
 
 
 

1990 births
Living people
Actors from Torrance, California
American actresses of Chinese descent
American actresses of Taiwanese descent
Tisch School of the Arts alumni
Actresses from California
21st-century American actresses
American stage actresses
American film actresses
American film actors of Asian descent
Outstanding Performance by a Cast in a Motion Picture Screen Actors Guild Award winners